USS Growler was a 112-ton sloop-of-war, armed with ten 18-pounders and one 6-pounder, during the War of 1812. The United States Navy purchased Growler on Lake Champlain in 1812. The British captured her in 1813 and renamed her HMS Chub or Chubb. The Americans recaptured her at the Battle of Lake Champlain. She was sold in 1815.

American service and capture
Growler cruised under the command of Lieutenant Sidney Smith as part of Commodore Thomas Macdonough's squadron. Major George Taylor of the 100th Regiment captured Growler on 3 June 1813 on the Sorrell River near Ile aux Noix on the Canadian side of the lake and took her into the Royal Navy as HMS Shannon. They later renamed her HMS Chubb or Chub.

British service and recapture

Chub was under the command of Lieutenant James McGhie on 11 September 1814 at the Battle of Lake Champlain. Chub reached her station relatively unscathed and anchored. In the engagement Chub lost her main boom and bowsprit, and had her anchor cable severed. She had lost six men killed and 16 wounded. At McGhie's court martial for the loss of his ship, the board severely reprimanded him for not coming into action properly and for failing to anchor properly.

Fate
After the Americans recaptured the vessel, the sloop-of-war saw no further service. The Americans sold her at Whitehall, New York, in July 1815.

Notes

Citations

References
 Anon. (1908) Officers of the British Forces in Canada During the War of 1812-15. (Welland Tribune Print). 
 
 
 
 

Age of Sail sloops
War of 1812 ships of the United States
Sloops of the United States Navy
War of 1812 ships of the United Kingdom
1812 ships